Bruno Valfrid Ahlberg (born 23 April 1911 – 9 February 1966) was a Finnish boxer who competed in the 1932 and 1936 Summer Olympics. In 1932 he became the first Finnish boxer to win an Olympic medal, a bronze in the welterweight division. Four years later he lost his first bout in the middleweight competition.

Alhberg first competed nationally in ski jumping and swimming. He then changed to boxing and won the national titles in 1932 and 1933, placing second in 1935 representing Kiffen. After the 1936 Olympics he turned professional and had series of matches in South Africa (1937), United States (1939) and Europe (1938 and 1940–41). He retired in 1941 with a record of 11 wins, 9 losses and 5 draws. In 2008 he was inducted into the Finnish Boxing Hall of Fame.

1932 Olympic results
Bruno Ahlberg competed as a welterweight boxer for Finland at the 1932 Olympic Games in Los Angeles.  Here are his results from that tournament:

 Round of 16: defeated Tony Mancini (Canada) by decision
 Quarterfinal: defeated Luciano Fabbroni of (Italy) by decision
 Semifinal: lost to Erich Campe (Germany) by decision
 Bronze Medal Match: defeated Dave McCleave (Great Britain) by walkover (won bronze medal)

References

1911 births
1966 deaths
Sportspeople from Espoo
Welterweight boxers
Middleweight boxers
Olympic boxers of Finland
Boxers at the 1932 Summer Olympics
Boxers at the 1936 Summer Olympics
Olympic bronze medalists for Finland
Olympic medalists in boxing
Finnish male boxers
Medalists at the 1932 Summer Olympics